Jeffrey Maxwell Truman (4 November 1957 – 2 December 2014) was an Australian film and television screenwriter and actor.

Career
A member of the Australian Writer Guild for over 30 years,  Truman's television credits include Rescue: Special Ops, City Homicide, Packed to the Rafters, The Strip, Sea Patrol, Last Man Standing, The Alice, Stingers (nominated for an AWGIE Award for episode 118), McLeod's Daughters, Neighbours (for which he wrote 148 episodes, and was also nominated for an AWGIE Award for episode 4155), Home and Away as Sam Barlow in 1988, E Street, A Country Practice, Fat Tony & Co.,  Winter, and The Doctor Blake Mysteries. He also wrote for Underbelly: Razor (nominated for an AWGIE award in 2012), Underbelly: Badness, and Underbelly: Squizzy. In total Truman received five AWGIE nominations and in 2013, won the award for Best Original Mini Series for Underbelly: Badness.

Truman wrote the feature film Envy which premiered at the Toronto International Film Festival in 1999. He also had a small role in Bryan Singer's Superman Returns.

Truman died on 2 December 2014, after suffering a brain haemorrhage, he was 57.

Filmography

As writer

As actor

References

External links 
 TruMoney Films
 
 
 RGM Database

Australian television writers
Australian male television actors
1957 births
2014 deaths
Australian screenwriters
Australian male television writers